Giões is a freguesia (parish) in the municipality of Alcoutim (Algarve, Portugal). The population in 2011 was 256, in an area of 71.80 km².

Main sites
Relíquias Castle
Nossa Senhora da Oliveira Church

References

Freguesias of Alcoutim